Ho Chiu-mei (born 10 September 1962) is a Taiwanese former professional tennis player.

Ho comes from the city of Chiayi in southwestern Taiwan and is the youngest of five siblings. She took up tennis in sixth grade, encouraged by her physical education teacher who thought her build would suit a tennis player.

Debuting in 1978, Ho played on and off for the Chinese Taipei Federation Cup team over 16-years, featuring in a total of 24 ties, for four singles and six doubles wins. She also represented Chinese Taipei at the 1994 Asian Games and won a bronze medal in the team event.

Ho, who won eight successive national championships, began to have hearing loss in the 1990s, which was a hereditary condition in her family. When her hearing got bad enough that she could no longer hear the racket hit the ball she had to give up professional tennis.

In 2009 she represented Chinese Taipei at the Summer Deaflympics being hosted in her home country. She partnered with one of her elder sisters, Ho Chiu-hsiang, in the doubles event and they claimed a silver medal.

References

External links
 
 
 

1962 births
Living people
Taiwanese female tennis players
Deaf tennis players
Medalists at the 2009 Summer Deaflympics
Medalists at the 2013 Summer Deaflympics
Medalists at the 2017 Summer Deaflympics
Asian Games medalists in tennis
Asian Games bronze medalists for Chinese Taipei
Medalists at the 1994 Asian Games
Tennis players at the 1994 Asian Games
People from Chiayi
Deaflympic competitors for Chinese Taipei
20th-century Taiwanese women
21st-century Taiwanese women